Kenneth Roy Rickards (22 August 1923 – 21 August 1995) was a West Indian international cricketer who played in two Test matches from 1948 to 1952.

External links 
 

1923 births
1995 deaths
West Indies Test cricketers
Sportspeople from Kingston, Jamaica
Jamaican cricketers
Commonwealth XI cricketers
Essex cricketers
Jamaica cricketers